Uvalde may refer to:

Places
Uvalde County, Texas, United States
Uvalde, Texas
Uvalde Estates, Texas
Uvalde Consolidated Independent School District
Uvalda, Georgia, United States

Other uses
Juan de Uvalde (1729–1816), Spanish general and governor of Coahuila, Mexico, New Spain
USS Uvalde (AKA-88), an American Andromeda-class attack cargo ship
Robb Elementary School shooting, 2022 attack in Uvalde, Texas, U.S.

See also

Ugalde, Basque surname